The following is a list of Harvard Crimson men's basketball head coaches. There have been 17 head coaches of the Crimson in their 112-season history.

Harvard's current head coach is Tommy Amaker. He was hired as the Crimson's head coach in April 2007, replacing Frank Sullivan, who was fired after the 2006–07 season.

References

Harvard

Harvard Crimson basketball, men's, coaches